Babine is a sparkling alcoholic drink originating from Zaire.  It is made from the leaves of the avocado tree.

References

Democratic Republic of the Congo cuisine
Alcoholic drinks
Drugs in the Democratic Republic of the Congo